Fibropapillomatosis is a disease of several species; see:
Bovine papillomavirus

Turtle fibropapillomatosis